The ERP-22 de Agosto was an Argentinian guerrilla faction split in 1973 of the Military Committee of the Federal Capital of the People's Revolutionary Army (ERP), as a result of tactical divergences regarding the organization's position before the electoral act of March 11, 1973.

Reasons of the Split 
As the campaign for the 1973 presidential elections progressed, in which Peronism presented the Cámpora-Solano Lima formula, the Revolutionary Workers Party (PRT, the ERP party) continued to denounce Perón as a "tool of the regime bourgeois". ERP members who disagreed with this position were separated after the meeting of the Central Committee in December 1972 (the first in which Mario Santucho was present after returning from his exile in Cuba), in which they concluded that It was impossible to continue within the organization. There were also other ERP members who separated from the organization for other reasons.

Foundation of ERP-22 
On January 15, 1973, at a campsite in Buenos Aires, the ERP-August 22 held its founding congress. Almost all of its militants from the Buenos Aires Regional and the Military Committee of the ERP Capital. The initial structure of the ERP-22 was a copy of the command line that the splinters had when they were part of the ERP. In addition, the new ERP-22 made no distinction between party and army, leaving its name linked to the latter. On March 8, 1978, the Eduardo Capello Command publishes a statement speaking and encouraging Argentine society to vote in favor of FREJULI, in the elections of March 11, 1973, calling the people "to defeat the dictatorship at the polls, through the mass vote to the FREJULI lists "and" mobilize to verify compliance with these modifications. "The sympathy and the workers' and people's support that awakens is the one that brings together the greatest possibilities of defeating the government maneuver at the polls".

The date of the name refers to the day of 1972 in which the first large-scale joint operation of the ERP, Montoneros and Peronist Armed Forces (FAP) guerrillas takes place in order to free many of their main chiefs imprisoned in the Rawson criminal. On November 11, 1973 the group also organized a tribute to the villero leader of the San Pablo neighborhood and militant Nemesio Aquino, a well-known l"ocal revolutionary and militant who the group describes as "the worker who knew how to embrace the ideas of revolutionary Marxism and build the organization political-military essential to galvanize the progress of the people in their struggle for power".

Important Armed Actions

Kidnapping of Héctor Ricardo García 

The first action of ERP-22 was the kidnapping of the owner of the newspaper Crónica, Héctor Ricardo García. Héctor Ricardo García. It was called "Operation Poniatowski" because one of the guerrillas had read about a French politician named Jozef Antoni Poniatowski and, in contrast to the common surname García, on 22 he puts that name to the operation.

Operation Poniatowski is planned for March 6, 1973, but due to problems in one of the cars, it is postponed to day 8, when it is actually executed, under the responsibility of Víctor José Fernández Palmeiro, known as "el Gallego". At 8:20 local time they park a van and descend three guerrillas dressed in work clothes and carrying boxes of whiskey. The van leaves and they avoid the obstacle of the doorman of the building where García lived because he was not there. Previously, four combatants had been distributed in the nearby square with concealed machine guns in case complications occurred. Garcia's maids opened them because they presented the card of the mayor of Buenos Aires, Saturnino Montero Ruiz, as the one who sent the gifts. The guerrillas reduced the staff and came to Garcia, who slept next to a well-known television artist, and reassured him, while another militant arrived to pretend to be the maid in case some unforeseen event happened.

The ERP-22 required to release the publication, on the front page of the newspaper, of a statement calling to vote for FreJuLi. Garcia spoke with the director of the newspaper's evening edition to inform him of the statement he should publish. Then, the owner of Chronicle was taken to an ERP-22 dependent house, where he was held twelve hours until the newspaper edition came out, when he was released. At first it was believed that everything had been a maneuver to promote itself and although this theory was suggested, the editor knew that he had gone through a difficult experience and the ERP-August 22 had taken his first blow to affirm its independent existence.

Battle of Maschwitz 

In April 1973, the dictatorship was dying. The  president  Lanusse orders the  Army to go out on raking and control missions, especially in the  Gran Buenos Aires. The ERP-22 decides to make fun of these operations by taking the town of Engineer Maschwitz, near the capital of the country.

The "Operation Maschwitz" runs on Saturday 21 of that April. At 9 in the Carupá station, part of the twelve combatants who will be involved in the operation. There the weapons are distributed and uploaded to the vehicles (a Chevrolet 400, a Peugeot 504 and a  Pick-Up F-100). Forty-five minutes later, the `` El Gallego  Palmeiro's car enters the town, runs through it and then returns with the others. At 10.00 each of the operating groups marches to their positions: the first team, five militants, will take the police station; the second, two members, will take the mail and cancel the telegraph; The third with three will take care of the station and the fourth with two will cut the telephone lines.

The operation was practically without incident. The objectives (shots, weapons capture and graffiti) were achieved and after that, the guerrillas withdrew. At the police station there was a prisoner who was released and returned the next day on his own. The government made an operative bolt to capture the guerrillas, but they were able to escape. There were no armed clashes with security forces.

 Killing of the Counter admiral Quijada 

A few days before assuming Cámpora - whose candidacy had won - the ERP-22 decided to launch a new action: the "Operation Mercury", whose objective was to kill the Counter. Hermes Jaw. This  marine had been in charge of talking on television on behalf of the  FF. AA. Justifying the Trelew massacre in 1972

At the beginning of April 1973, Intelligence of the ERP-22 had received information about the address of Quijada's house. The guerrillas proceeded to carry out several checks of the area, in order to study their safety and customs: they found as a problem the significant custody of the nearby house of Minister Arturo Mor Roig, but they were able to determine that the sailor usually left his house among the 8:30 and 9:30 in a white Dodge Polara, who previously removed  garage from his driver, and did not take a fixed route.

Again the responsibility of the operation fell to Víctor José Fernández Palmeiro aka `` El Gallego , who prepared a plan that consisted of following Quijada's car with a motorcycle (whose driver would receive a signal from a car parked on the direction taken by Dodge Polara), the passenger would be the `` Gallego , who would jump from it and riddle Quijada with a Falcon submachine gun and then get on again and the driver swiftly take him out of the area . A first attempt was made, which failed because the militant in the parked car made the wrong signal to the motorcycle and it took another path. For this failure the operation was postponed until Monday, April 30.

However, the following week, the operation would be effectively executed, on Monday April 30. At 9:10 the Quijada vehicle starts and is followed by the motorcycle with `` El Gallego  and another militant driving. In the corner of Junín and Sarmiento streets, Quijada is shot dead, his driver is able to shoot the `` Gallego  in the stomach, the militants leave and the driver breaks the gear lever. At the entrance of the Faculty of Law, a car waited for them with which they continued on their way to intervene surgically, but Palmeiro finally died, but not before learning about the success of the operation by radio. His last words were: "I avenged you!" The group describes the result of the attack and the death of El Gallego as "The newspapers of the time reported profusely about the death of Quijada. What they did not say, is that as of April 30, Galician Victor José Fernández Palmeiro, next to the sixteen martyrs of Trelew, he began to live in the heart of his town.
To El Gallego'' he was almost immediately authorized a martyr of the group and an icon for armed movements during the 70´s.

References

Organizations established in 1973
Guerrilla organizations
Far-left politics
Operation Condor
History of Argentina (1973–1976)
Pages with unreviewed translations